Werner Klein (born 25 January 1950 in Burbach (Saarbrücken) is a German entrepreneur, investor and former racing driver residing in Switzerland.

Biography 
After graduating as a merchant in wholesale and foreign trade, Klein took over his parents' beverage wholesale Klein Getränke GmbH in Saarbrücken and founded the alldrink Getränkefachmarktkette (alldrink chain of warehouse stores for beverages). Due to changes in trade, he established a system-controlled logistics center for beverages in Neunkirchen/Saar in 1995. In 1998, first HM InterDrink Getränke Service GmbH and subsequently Winkels Getränke Holding took over the majority of Klein Getränke GmbH, which merged with Gross Getränkevertrieb GmbH in 2001.

From 2000 to 2002 Klein was a member of the Business Angels network of the IHK Saarland At the end of 2002 he relocated to Switzerland and founded ProCon Invest AG (real estate and investments). In 2014 Klein bought the business premises of C&A in Ulm. In 2019 the foundation of ProCon Real Estate GbR, a family office, took place. The family office acquired in 2019 a premium property in the city center of Freiburg im Breisgau. Klein's real estate investments became known through transactions in inner-city prime locations.

Entrepreneurial participations 
 ProCon Invest AG: Board of directors
 ProCon Real Estate GbR: Chief Representative

Sports career 
Between 1972 and 1977 Klein was an active racing driver, winning the Formula Vee on the AVUS racing track in Berlin in 1974 and finishing on fourth place in the Formula Three championship in 1976.

Personal life 
Werner Klein is the father of two children, son Marc and daughter Linda, is engaged to Christina Kellenberger and lives in Lucerne on Lake Lucerne.

References 

1950 births
People from Saarbrücken
People from the Rhine Province
Living people
Racing drivers from Saarland
German founders
Businesspeople from Saarland